Lathe of Heaven may refer to:
 The Lathe of Heaven, a 1971 novel by Ursula K. Le Guin
 The Lathe of Heaven (film), a 1980 made-for-TV film based on the novel
 Lathe of Heaven (film), a 2002 made-for-TV film based on the novel
 Lathe of Heaven (album), a 2014 album by jazz saxophonist Mark Turner